Carolina Nevenka Goić Borojević (born 20 December 1972, Puerto Natales) is a Chilean politician, currently serving as president of the Chilean Christian Democratic Party (PDC). She is a Senator for Magallanes, former Deputy for the 60th district, which includes the communities of Rio Verde, Laguna Blanca, Cape Horn, Porvenir, Primavera, Punta Arenas, San Gregorio, Timaukel and Torres del Paine.

She is of Croatian heritage; the niece of Alejandro Goic Karmelic.

She entered the Catholic University of Chile, where graduated as a social worker. Then she obtained magister degree in economics at the Catholic University of Chile.

She is married to Christian Kirk Miranda, a marine biologist by profession and photographer, and served as director of the National Tourism Service (Sernatur) in the Magallanes and Chilean Antarctic region. She is the mother of two daughters: Catalina and Alejandra.

On 11 March 2017 Carolina Goic was proclaimed by the Christian Democratic Party as Presidential candidate in the Chilean general election. On 29 April 2017, the PDC decided not to participate in a New Majority primary, breaking away from the coalition after 28 years. On 11 May 2017 the PDC officially registered her candidacy before the Electoral Service of Chile ("Servel").

Goic is a member of the Inter-American Dialogue.

References

External links 
Official website

1972 births
Living people
People from Puerto Natales
Chilean people of Croatian descent
Christian Democratic Party (Chile) politicians
Members of the Chamber of Deputies of Chile
Members of the Senate of Chile
Women members of the Chamber of Deputies of Chile
Members of the Inter-American Dialogue
Senators of the LV Legislative Period of the National Congress of Chile
Pontifical Catholic University of Chile alumni